is a Japanese manga series written and illustrated by Taichi Kawazoe. It has been serialized in Square Enix's shōnen manga magazine Monthly Shōnen Gangan since June 2017, with its chapters collected into eleven tankōbon volumes as of March 2023. An anime television series adaptation by TNK aired from October to December 2022.

Plot
Kikuru Madan is a skilled hunter who plans on retiring to ensure he enjoys his youth. One day, the guild receptionist, Enome, convinces him to go on a quest with a new martial artist named Hitamu Kyan. However, Hitamu proves to be terrible in terms of fighting monsters and is attracting them instead. Kikuru's retirement is put on hold as more members join the party.

Characters

Kikuru is a 20-year-old hunter who uses a bow and arrow as well as a dagger.

Nicknamed , Hitamu is a martial artist who has dog ears and believes in hard work.

Maidena is a white mage who acts arrogant due to her skills and intelligence. During combat, however, she displays a fearful personality. 

Tokishikko is a black mage who has a lazy personality. She is a childhood friend of Hanabata's.

Hanabata is a warrior. Whenever she uses her Flower Frenzy skill, she enters an intoxicated state with tremendous power and speed.  She is a childhood friend of Tokishikko's.

Noma is a red mage. Due to his feminine appearance, he is often mistakenly believed to be a girl. 

Enome is the receptionist of Kikuru's guild, whom he has a crush on. 

Eshune is Enome's daughter. She wants her mother and Kikuru to get married so the latter can be her new father.

Media

Manga
Written and illustrated by Taichi Kawazoe, Immoral Guild began serialization in Square Enix's shōnen manga magazine Monthly Shōnen Gangan on June 12, 2017. As of March 2023, eleven tankōbon volumes have been released. Square Enix is publishing the series digitally in English in the global version of its Manga UP! service.

Volume list

Anime
An anime television series adaptation was announced on March 11, 2022. The series was produced by TNK and directed by Takuya Asaoka, with scripts written by Kazuyuki Fudeyasu, character designs handled by Hiraku Kaneko, and music composed by Ryō Shirasawa. It aired from on October 5 to December 21, 2022 on AT-X and other networks. Sentai Filmworks licensed the series and streamed all the episodes on HIDIVE on February 18, 2023.

Episode list

Notes

References

External links
  
  
 

Anime series based on manga
AT-X (TV network) original programming
Censored television series
Gangan Comics manga
Hunting in popular culture
Sentai Filmworks
Sex comedy anime and manga
Shōnen manga
TNK (company)